The 1963 Pittsburgh Panthers football team represented the University of Pittsburgh in the 1963 NCAA University Division football season. Led by ninth-year head coach John Michelosen, the Panthers were 9–1 and were fourth in the final AP poll, third in the coaches poll.

The Panthers did not play in a bowl game; their most recent postseason appearance was in 1956 and the next was in 1973.

Schedule

 Opener at UCLA was played on Friday night.
 Following the assassination of President Kennedy, the Penn State game was postponed two weeks to December 7.

Coaching staff

Season summary

at UCLA

Washington

California

at West Virginia

at #10 Navy

Syracuse

at Notre Dame

Army

at Miami (FL)

Penn State

Team players drafted into the NFL 

Source

Media

Radio

References

Pittsburgh
Pittsburgh Panthers football seasons
Pittsburgh Panthers football